Sir Timothy John "Tim" Berners-Lee,  (born 8 June 1955), also known as "TimBL", the inventor of the World Wide Web, has received a number of awards and honours.

Awards
 
 
 
 
 
 
 
 
 
 
 
 
 
 
 
 
 
 

 
 
 
 
 
 
 
 
 
  
 
 
 
 
 
 
 
 
 
 
 
  that was shared with Jimmy Wales.
  in Zurich, Switzerland
 8 February 2016: John Maynard Keynes Prize

National honours
 
 
  (The Order of Merit is within the personal gift of The Queen, and does not require recommendation by ministers or the Prime Minister)
 
  (decree signed on 4 February 2015).

Tim Berners Lee has received two awards of which the date are unknown. These are:
 Fellow of the Royal Academy of Engineering (FREng)
 Fellow of the Royal Society of Arts (FRSA)

References

External links 

 W3C Biography with list of awards

Berners-Lee
Tim
Tim Berners-Lee